The Urgench trolleybus system links Urgench, the capital city of Xorazm Region in western Uzbekistan, with the neighbouring city of Khiva.  Since the closure of the Tashkent trolleybus system in 2010, it has been Uzbekistan's only trolleybus system.

History
On 20 October 1997, urban trolleybuses came to Urgench, with the inauguration of line 1 between Aeroport (Urgench Airport) and Temir Yul Vokzali (railway station). Urgench thereby became the last city in Uzbekistan in which a trolleybus system was opened. In 1998 came the overland line 2 to Khiva, near the border with Turkmenistan, to complete the expansion of the trolleybus system.
 
As early as 2002, the urban line 1 was closed.  Since then, only the overland line 2 has remained.

On 26 October 2009, the Government of Uzbekistan decided to close the remaining trolleybus systems in Jizzakh and Namangan at the end of 2009, and in the capital Tashkent during 2010. The Urgench system was the only one not slated for closure; instead of that, nine new trolleybuses were to be procured.
 
Since then, a short extension section in Khiva, including a link to a depot, has been under construction, with commissioning scheduled for summer 2010.

Lines 
The short section of the overhead wire from the city centre to the railway station (Temir Yul Vokzali), previously served only by line 1, has been dismantled.

Line 2 essentially follows the course of the Urgench–Khiva road.  In the city centres of Urgench and Khiva, the route followed by this line is determined by one-way streets.

The Aeroport terminus, which operates only when required, is located just outside Urgench Airport.

The Khiva terminus is on the northern edge of the Itchan Kala fortress (now a World Heritage Site), east of its north gate. West of the fortress is another, unused, short section of overhead wire, with a loop at the west gate. This section is not connected by switches with the regularly used section, but can be used to short cut the regular round trip.

Another, not yet operational section (not shown on the map), branches off immediately after the Khiva terminus, but is not yet connected with the rest of the system.

Fleet 

For the opening of the system in 1997, Škoda delivered six 14Tr trolleybuses with the numbers 001 to 006, and three more modern 14TrM trolleybuses numbered 007 to 009.  They had been manufactured in the Škoda factory in Ostrov nad Ohri in the Czech Republic.

The primary external difference between the 14Trs and the 14TrMs is the matrix display on the latter model's front. In Urgench, this display is not used to show destinations.

As of 2010, all nine vehicles were still in service.

In 2013, 9 new Škoda 24Tr Irisbus trolleybuses entered service.

Depot
The system's depot is in Urgench. However, there are no switches between the service line and the operating lines.

See also

List of trolleybus systems
Trolleybuses in former Soviet Union countries

References

Sources
Haseldine, Peter (2007). "Trolleynews". Trolleybus Magazine No. 267, p. 72. National Trolleybus Association (UK). .

External links

 
 

Trolleybus systems by city
Trolleybus transport in Uzbekistan